Noelia Soledad Fernández (born 15 March 1978) is a road cyclist from Argentina. She represented her nation at the 2006 UCI Road World Championships.

References

External links
 profile at Procyclingstats.com

1978 births
Argentine female cyclists
Living people
Place of birth missing (living people)